Wesley Harms (born 11 June 1984) is a Dutch former professional darts player.

Career

Harms won the BDO International Open in 2011, defeating Stephen Bunting in the final.

Harms qualified for the 2012 BDO World Darts Championship as the 13th seed. He defeated Martin Phillips, Robbie Green, and fellow débutant Paul Jennings to reach the semi-final where he was defeated 6–5 by Tony O'Shea. Harms's performance, followed by subsequent strong runs in the coming months, saw him briefly top the WDF world rankings. Among Harms's other achievements were reaching the semi-finals of the Winmau World Masters in 2012, repeating his world championship semi-final run in 2013 where he was once again beaten by O'Shea, winning the WDF World Cup in 2013 beating world number one Stephen Bunting 7–6 in the final, and reaching the semi-finals of the Zuiderduin Masters in 2013 where he was beaten 3–2 by Bunting. However, he was defeated in the second round of the 2014 World Championship by Tony Eccles after throwing for the match in the sixth set and missing one dart at double 16 to win, also leaving double 18 for the match in the next leg only to see Eccles hit 122 for the set.

2020
Harms won a PDC Tour Card on day 4 of the European Q School. He will play on the ProTour in 2020 and 2021.

2022
Due to losing his tour card and playing no events since the pandemic. He will not return to the 2022 PDC Q School.

Nickname

Wesley Harms played under the nickname Sparky because he is an electrician in the Netherlands.

World Championship results

BDO

 2012: Semi-finals (lost to Tony O'Shea 5–6)
 2013: Semi-finals (lost to Tony O'Shea 4–6)
 2014: 2nd round (lost to Tony Eccles 3–4)
 2015: 1st round (lost to Jeff Smith 1–3)
 2016: Quarter-finals (lost to Jamie Hughes 1–5)
 2017: 1st round (lost to Krzysztof Ratajski 0–3)
 2018: 1st round (lost to Wayne Warren 1–3)
 2019: 2nd round (lost to Willem Mandigers 2–4)
 2020: 2nd round (lost to Scott Waites 2–4)

Career finals

WDF major finals: 1 (1 title)

Performance timeline

References

External links

1984 births
Living people
Dutch darts players
Sportspeople from Alkmaar
British Darts Organisation players
Professional Darts Corporation former tour card holders